Rick Amann (born 30 December 1960) is a German ice hockey player. He competed in the men's tournaments at the 1992 Winter Olympics and the 1994 Winter Olympics.

References

External links
 

1960 births
Living people
Abbotsford Flyers players
EHC Freiburg players
Ice hockey players at the 1992 Winter Olympics
Ice hockey players at the 1994 Winter Olympics
Ice hockey people from Manitoba
New Westminster Bruins players
Olympic ice hockey players of Germany
People from Central Plains Region, Manitoba
UBC Thunderbirds ice hockey players